Raposo Tavares is a district in the city of São Paulo, Brazil.

External links
 

Districts of São Paulo